The Quetzaltenango Guatemala Temple is the second temple built by the Church of Jesus Christ of Latter-day Saints (LDS Church) in Guatemala. It was the fifth temple of the church in Central America. The temple is located in the western part of the city, near the Parque Zoológico Minerva.

History
Construction of the temple was announced by church president Gordon B. Hinckley on December 16, 2006. Construction commenced following a groundbreaking ceremony on March 14, 2009. The temple open house was held from November 11–26, 2011. The temple was dedicated on December 11, 2011, by Dieter F. Uchtdorf of the church's First Presidency; it was the first temple dedicated by Uchtdorf.

See also

Comparison of temples of The Church of Jesus Christ of Latter-day Saints
List of temples of The Church of Jesus Christ of Latter-day Saints
List of temples of The Church of Jesus Christ of Latter-day Saints by geographic region
Temple architecture (Latter-day Saints)
The Church of Jesus Christ of Latter-day Saints in Guatemala

References

External links
Quetzaltenango Guatemala Temple Official site
Quetzaltenango Guatemala Temple at ChurchofJesusChristTemples.org

21st-century Latter Day Saint temples
Buildings and structures in Quetzaltenango
Temples (LDS Church) in Latin America
The Church of Jesus Christ of Latter-day Saints in Guatemala
2011 establishments in Guatemala
Religious buildings and structures completed in 2011
Temples (LDS Church) in Guatemala